

31 May 2008 (Saturday)
Athletics:
 Usain Bolt of Jamaica sets a new world record in the 100 metres, running 9.72 seconds in the Reebok Grand Prix in New York City.
Baseball:
 Manny Ramirez becomes the 24th Major League Baseball player with 500 career home runs, connecting off the Baltimore Orioles' Chad Bradford for a solo shot in the seventh inning of a 6–3 Boston Red Sox win over the Orioles at Camden Yards.
Cricket:
2008 Indian Premier League
2nd Semifinal — Chennai Super Kings 116/1 (14.5 ov.) beat Kings XI Punjab 112/8 (20 ov.) by 9 wickets
2008 ICC World Cricket League Division Five
Final- 81/8 (37.4 ov) beat  80 (39.5 ov.) by 2 wickets
3rd Place- 189 (46.3 ov.) beat  93 (42.4 ov.) by 96 runs
5th Place- 119 (42.1 ov.) beat  104 (37 ov.) by 15 runs
7th Place- 157/8 (46.1 ov.) beat  153 (45.5 ov.) by 2 wickets
9th Place- 182/3 (43.2 ov.) beat  181 (48.2 ov.) by 7 wickets
11th Place- 116/4 (35.2 ov.) beat  113 (29.3 ov.) by 6 wickets
Football:
Europeada 2008
Danes in Germany 15 Catalans 1
Rhaetians 5 Germans in Hungary 1
Germans in Denmark 19 North Frissians 4
Welsh 0 Germans in Poland 2
Aromunians 0 South Tyrol 3
Croats in Serbia 0 Roma in Hungary 2
Occitaniians 2 Cimbrians 1
Sorbs 4 Croats in Romania 1
Ice hockey:
 2008 Stanley Cup Finals, Game 4 at Pittsburgh:
 Detroit Red Wings 2, Pittsburgh Penguins 1 — Red Wings lead series 3–1
Rugby union:
Guinness Premiership Final at Twickenham, London:
London Wasps 26–16 Leicester Tigers
 In front of a capacity crowd of 81,600, a world record for a club match in rugby union, Wasps give their retiring captain Lawrence Dallaglio a grand send-off by winning their fourth Premiership title in six seasons.
 Super 14 Final at Christchurch:
Crusaders  20–12  Waratahs

30 May 2008 (Friday)
Basketball:
 NBA Eastern Conference Finals, Game 6 at Auburn Hills, Michigan:
 Boston Celtics 89, Detroit Pistons 81 — Celtics win series 4–2
 The Celtics advance to their first NBA Finals in over 20 years.
Cricket:
2008 Indian Premier League
1st Semifinal — Rajasthan Royals 192/9 (20 ov.) beat Delhi Daredevils 87 (16.1 ov.) by 105 runs
2008 ICC World Cricket League Division Five
Semifinal 1- 142 (49.3 ov.) beat  105 (45.5 ov.) by 37 runs
Semifinal 2- 220/5 (50 ov.) beat  136 (38.2 ov.) by 84 runs
5th Place Semifinal 1- 126 (45.4 ov.) beat  117 (38.5 ov.) by 9 runs
5th Place Semifinal 2- 203/8 (50 ov.) beat  149 (46.4 ov.) by 54 runs
9th Place Semifinal 1- 238/6 (50 ov.) beat  139 (39.3 ov.) by 99 runs
9th Place Semifinal 2- 202/5 (50 ov.) beat  150 (39.5 ov.) by 52 runs

29 May 2008 (Thursday)
Association football:
 Scottish Premier League:
 Gretna were demoted a further two divisions, due to their financial instability. They are scheduled to play their 2008–09 games in the Scottish Third Division, however this is not certain due to Gretna having no squad members.
 FA Premier League:
 Henk ten Cate is relieved of his role as assistant manager of Chelsea, 5 days after the sacking of manager Avram Grant.
Major League Baseball
San Francisco Giants 4, Arizona Diamondbacks 3
In a no-decision, pitcher Randy Johnson throws 9 strikeouts, tying him for the second-most strikeouts in an MLB career with Roger Clemens, with 4,672.
Basketball:
 NBA Western Conference Finals, Game 5 at Los Angeles:
 Los Angeles Lakers 100, San Antonio Spurs 92 — Lakers win series 4–1
 Lakers advance to their first NBA Finals in the post-Shaq era.
Cricket:
2008 ICC World Cricket League Division Five
 201 (34.5 ov.) beat  67/5 (27/27 ov.) by 52 runs(D/L)
Rain shortened Japan's innings to 27 overs
 151/4 (37.2 ov.) beat  145 (47.1 ov.) by 6 wickets
 88/4 (22 ov.) vs. -No Result
 182 (50 ov.) vs. -No result
The match between Japan and Singapore was a replay from 26 May. All other matches are replays from 28 May. The rained out matches will not be replayed. These matches conclude the group stage of the tournament.

28 May 2008 (Wednesday)

Basketball:
 NBA Eastern Conference Finals, Game 5 at Boston:
 Boston Celtics 106, Detroit Pistons 102 — Celtics lead series 3–2
Cricket:
2008 ICC World Cricket League Division Five
 vs. -Match abandoned without a ball bowled
 vs. -Match abandoned without a ball bowled
 vs. -Match abandoned without a ball bowled
 vs. -Match abandoned without a ball bowled
 vs. -Match abandoned without a ball bowled
 vs. -Match abandoned without a ball bowled
Ice hockey:
 2008 Stanley Cup Finals, Game 3 at Pittsburgh:
 Pittsburgh Penguins 3, Detroit Red Wings 2 — Red Wings lead series 2–1
Shooting:
 ISSF World Cup in Milan, Italy
 , the reigning World Junior Champion, equals the world record in 25 m Rapid Fire Pistol with 591 points and enters the final one point ahead of teammate Ralf Schumann. Increasing the gap to the runner-up by over three points, he then raises Schumann's week-old final world record from 790.0 to 794.0.

27 May 2008 (Tuesday)

Basketball:
 NBA Western Conference Finals at San Antonio, Texas:
 Los Angeles Lakers 93, San Antonio Spurs 91 — Lakers lead series 3–1
Cricket:
2008 ICC World Cricket League Division Five
 107/4 (28.1/33 ov.) beat  104 (32.4/33 ov.) by 6 wickets
Match reduced to 33 overs a side due to rain
 111/7 (33.4/36 ov.) beat  110 (33.2/36 ov.) by 3 wickets
Match reduced to 36 overs a side due to rain
 220/9 (46/46 ov.) beat  83 (32.1/46 ov.) by 137 runs
Match reduced to 46 overs a side due to rain
 145 (29.3/30 ov.) beat  76 (20.2/30 ov.) by 69 runs
Match reduced to 30 overs a side due to rain
 115 (24.2/26 ov.) tied  115/8 (26/26 ov.)
Match reduced to 26 overs a side due to rain
 67/3 (15.1 ov.) beat  66 (39.3 ov.) by 7 wickets

26 May 2008 (Monday)

Basketball:
 NBA Eastern Conference Finals, Game 4 at Auburn Hills, Michigan:
 Detroit Pistons 94, Boston Celtics 75 — Series tied 2–2
Ice hockey:
 2008 Stanley Cup Finals, Game 2 at Detroit:
 Detroit Red Wings 3, Pittsburgh Penguins 0 — Red Wings lead series 2–0
Cricket:
Australian cricket team in the West Indies in 2008
1st Test- 431 (126.5 ov.) & 167 (56.5 ov.) beat  312 (106 ov.) & 191 (67 ov.) by 95 runs
 lead the 3 Test series 1–0
New Zealand cricket team in England in 2008
2nd Test- 202 (83.3 ov.) & 294/4 (88 ov.) beat  381 (90.3 ov.) & 114 (41.2 ov.) by 6 wickets
 lead the 3 Test series 1–0
2008 ICC World Cricket League Division Five
 97/3 (28.1 ov.) beat  96 (38.2 ov.) by 7 wickets
 204 (49.4 ov.) beat  96 (46.4 ov.) by 108 runs
 89/3 (19.2/24 ov.) beat  88/9 (24/24 ov.) by 7 wickets
Match reduced to 24 overs a side due to rain
 129/3 (19.5 ov.) beat  128 (34.4 ov.) by 7 wickets
 206/4 (32/32 ov.) beat  78 (25.2/32 ov.) by 128 runs
Match reduced to 32 overs a side due to rain
 vs. -Match abandoned without a ball bowled

25 May 2008 (Sunday)

Ice hockey:
2008 Memorial Cup final in Kitchener, Ontario:
Spokane Chiefs (Western Hockey League) 4, Kitchener Rangers (Ontario Hockey League) 1
Auto racing:
92nd Indianapolis 500: Indianapolis Motor Speedway in Speedway, Indiana
(1) Scott Dixon  (2) Vítor Meira  (3) Marco Andretti 
Formula One: Monaco Grand Prix in Monte Carlo, Monaco
(1) Lewis Hamilton  (2) Robert Kubica  (3) Felipe Massa 
NASCAR Sprint Cup: Coca-Cola 600 in Concord, North Carolina
(1) Kasey Kahne  (2) Kyle Busch  (3) Greg Biffle 
Basketball:
 NBA Western Conference Finals at San Antonio, Texas:
 San Antonio Spurs 103, Los Angeles Lakers 84 — Lakers lead series 2–1
Cricket:
2008 ICC World Cricket League Division Five
 49/5 (6.3 ov.) beat  46 (24 ov.) by 5 wickets
 87/0 (14.5 ov.) beat  85 (31.1 ov.) by 10 wickets
 238/7 (50 ov.) beat  19 (14.5 ov.) BY 219 runs
Mehboob Alam becomes the first bowler to take all ten wickets in an innings in an ICC recognized tournament.
 184/7 (47.3 ov.) beat  183/9 (50 ov.) by 3 wickets
 125/2 (34.1 ov.) beat  124/8 (50 ov.) by 8 wickets
All matches above are replays of abandoned matches from May 24.
Rugby sevens: IRB Sevens
London Sevens at Twickenham
Cup Final:  19–14 
 clinch the overall series crown with one round to spare by winning the Plate competition.

24 May 2008 (Saturday)

Basketball:
 NBA Eastern Conference Finals at Auburn Hills, Michigan:
 Boston Celtics 94, Detroit Pistons 80 — Celtics lead series 2–1
Cricket
2008 ICC World Cricket League Division Five
 78/4 (9 ov.) beat  75 (28.1 ov.) by 6 wickets
 70 (28.5 ov.) vs.  2/0 (0.1 ov.)- No Result
 108/1 (21 ov.) vs. - No result
 105/5 (24.2 ov.) vs. - No result
 91/1 (23 ov.) vs. - No result
 140/0 (26 ov.) vs. - No result
Ice hockey:
 2008 Stanley Cup Finals, Game 1 at Detroit:
 Detroit Red Wings 4, Pittsburgh Penguins 0 – Red Wings lead series, 1–0
Rugby union:
Heineken Cup Final in Cardiff
Toulouse  13–16 (Ireland) Munster
Super 14 semifinals
Crusaders  33–22  Hurricanes  in Christchurch
Waratahs  28–13  Sharks  in Sydney
Shooting:
ISSF World Cup in Milan, Italy
 becomes the tenth woman to break maximum 400 points in the qualification round of 10 m Air Rifle, and sets a new final record after a score of 105.0 (out of the possible 109.0) in the final round.

23 May 2008 (Friday)
Basketball:
 NBA Western Conference Finals at Los Angeles:
 Los Angeles Lakers 101, San Antonio Spurs 71 — Lakers lead series 2–0
Cricket
2008 ICC World Cricket League Division Five
 70/3 (20.2 ov.) beat  69 (39.4 ov) by 7 wickets
 150/1 (27.4 ov.) beat  148/7 (50 ov.) by 9 wickets
 360/3 (50 ov.) beat  177 (39.5 ov.) by 183 runs
 179 (35.2 ov.) beat  87 (40.2 ov.) by 92 runs
 205 (48.4 ov.) beat  135 (36 ov.) by 70 runs
 189 (49.4 ov.) beat  96 (41.4 ov.) by 93 runs

22 May 2008 (Thursday)
Basketball:
 NBA Eastern Conference Finals at Boston:
 Detroit Pistons 103, Boston Celtics 97 — Series tied 1–1
 Detroit hands Boston its first home loss in the 2008 NBA Playoffs, and takes home court advantage.
Soccer:
2008 Toulon Tournament:

21 May 2008 (Wednesday)
Association football:
 2007–08 UEFA Champions League Final
Manchester United  1–1  Chelsea (6–5 penalty shootout)
 Cristiano Ronaldo kicks off the scoring for the Red Devils in the 26th minute, and Frank Lampard answers for the Blues in the 45th minute.  After a clean second half and scoreless extra time, Ronaldo has United's third penalty kick saved by Petr Čech.  But John Terry misses the fifth (and what would have been final) penalty kick for Chelsea to make it square again.  The Red Devils seal the Champions League/Premier League double when Edwin van der Sar saves Nicolas Anelka's attempt in the seventh round.
Basketball:
 NBA Western Conference Finals at Los Angeles:
 Los Angeles Lakers 89, San Antonio Spurs 85 — Lakers lead series 1–0
 The Lakers erase a 20-point third-quarter deficit to take the series lead.

20 May 2008 (Tuesday)

American football:
 NFL owners unanimously vote to opt out of the league's collective bargaining agreement with its players' union. This could lead to a season without a salary cap in 2010 and a lockout in 2011. The league, however, said that negotiations for a new agreement will continue. (ESPN)
 The league's owners also award Super Bowl XLVI (2012) to the soon-to-be-opened Lucas Oil Stadium in Indianapolis.
Basketball:
 NBA Eastern Conference Finals at Boston:
 Boston Celtics 88, Detroit Pistons 79 — Celtics lead series 1–0
 2008 NBA draft Lottery:
 The Chicago Bulls earn the first pick in the draft despite having only a 1.7% chance of winning the lottery. The Miami Heat, with the league's worst record, draw the second pick.

19 May 2008 (Monday)

Baseball:
Boston Red Sox pitcher Jon Lester throws a no-hitter in Boston's 7–0 home win over the Kansas City Royals. It is the first no-hitter in the majors since teammate Clay Buchholz performed the feat against Baltimore last September. Lester gives up nothing but two walks and strikes out nine. Jason Varitek becomes the first catcher to catch four Major League no-hitters.
Basketball:
 NBA Conference Semifinals:
 Western Conference Semifinals:
San Antonio Spurs 91, New Orleans Hornets 82 — Spurs win series 4–3
 The Spurs, with Manu Ginóbili leading all scorers with 26 and Tim Duncan picking up a double-double, survive a furious fourth-quarter Hornets comeback in New Orleans that saw a 17-point lead reduced to 3 within the last two minutes. They now travel to Los Angeles to start the Western Conference Finals with the Lakers.
Cricket:
New Zealand cricket team in England in 2008
1st Test- 319 (111.3 ov.) drew with  277 (86.2 ov.) & 269/6 (86.2 ov.)
Ice hockey:
2008 Stanley Cup playoffs
Detroit Red Wings 4, Dallas Stars 1 — Red Wings win series 4–2
In the Western Conference finals, the Red Wings win the Clarence S. Campbell Bowl as conference champions, and will face the Pittsburgh Penguins in the best-of-seven Stanley Cup Finals.
Shooting:
ISSF World Cup in Munich, Germany
, the three-time Olympic champion, wins the high-class 25 m Rapid Fire Pistol competition with a new final world record of 790.0 points, 1.2 points higher than his own year-old mark.

18 May 2008 (Sunday)
Auto racing:
Deutsche Tourenwagen Masters: Round 4 at EuroSpeedway, Germany
(1) Paul di Resta  (2) Timo Scheider  (3) Mattias Ekström 
FIA GT Championship: Monza 2 Hours in Autodromo Nazionale Monza, Italy
(1) Christophe Bouchut  & Xavier Maassen  (2) Alexandre Negrao   & Miguel Ramos  (3) Philipp Peter  & Allan Simonsen 
World Rally Championship: Rally d'Italia Sardegna around Porto Cervo, Italy
(1) Sébastien Loeb  (2) Mikko Hirvonen  (3) Jari-Matti Latvala 

Ice hockey:
2008 IIHF World Championship:
 5–4 
Ilya Kovalchuk scores his first goal of the tournament to tie the game with only five minutes left in regulation time, and his second in overtime, giving Russia its second title (24th if combined with the Soviet Union). Silver medalist Dany Heatley is named the tournament's most valuable player after a total of 20 points.
2008 Stanley Cup playoffs:
Pittsburgh Penguins 6, Philadelphia Flyers 0 — Penguins win series 4–1
The Penguins comfortably win the Pennsylvania derby to win the Prince of Wales Trophy as Eastern Conference champions, and clinch a place in the Stanley Cup Finals.
Basketball:
 NBA Conference Semifinals:
 Eastern Conference Semifinals:
Boston Celtics 97, Cleveland Cavaliers 92 — Celtics win series 4–3
 Paul Pierce scores 41 points, including the clinching free throws with 7.9 seconds left, and the Celtics survive a 45-point onslaught from LeBron James at home.
Motorcycle racing:
Moto GP F.I.M. Road Racing World Championship: French motorcycle Grand Prix, at Le Mans Bugatti Circuit near Le Mans, France.
(1) Valentino Rossi  (2) Jorge Lorenzo  (3) Colin Edwards

17 May 2008 (Saturday)
Association football:
 2008 FA Cup Final at Wembley Stadium, London
 Cardiff City 0–1 Portsmouth
 1948–49 Nwankwo Kanu's goal in the 37th minute is enough to give Pompey their first major trophy since winning back-to-back league titles in 1949 and 1950 and their first FA Cup since 1939.
Auto racing:
NASCAR Sprint Cup: Sprint All-Star Race in Concord, North Carolina
(1) Kasey Kahne  (2) Greg Biffle  (3) Matt Kenseth 
 Kahne becomes the first driver to enter the All-Star Race via fan voting to win the non-points race and its $1 million first prize.

Horse racing:
 U.S. Triple Crown
 2008 Preakness Stakes: (1) Big Brown (2) Macho Again (3) Icabad Crane
 Big Brown becomes the fourth horse to complete the Derby–Preakness double while still unbeaten, winning by 5¼ lengths.  He will be the eleventh horse to enter the Belmont Stakes with a chance at the Triple Crown since Affirmed became the most recent horse to win it in 1978.
Ice hockey:
2008 IIHF World Championship:
 4–0 
Goaltender Niklas Bäckström saves all 36 shots in Quebec City as Finland claims the bronze medals.

<div id="16_May_2008"> </div id>

16 May 2008 (Friday)
Baseball:
Jayson Werth hits three home runs and ties a Philadelphia Phillies record with eight runs batted in in the Phillies' 10–3 win over the Toronto Blue Jays.
2008 Summer Olympics
South African double-amputee sprinter Oscar Pistorius, who had previously been disqualified from participating in the Olympic Games by the IAAF because he uses prosthetic legs, has won an appeal of the decision to the Court of Arbitration for Sport.  The IAAF accepted the decision.  He is cleared to qualify for individual events, and has already been selected for relay events. 
Basketball:
 NBA Conference Semifinals:
Western Conference Semifinals:
Los Angeles Lakers 108, Utah Jazz 105, Lakers win series 4–2
A furious comeback from the Jazz on their home floor fizzled out when Deron Williams and Andrei Kirilenko missed three-pointers that could have sent the game into overtime in the dying seconds.
The two other ongoing series—New Orleans Hornets–San Antonio Spurs in the Western Conference and the Boston Celtics–Cleveland Cavaliers in the Eastern Conference—were extended to Game 7, with the home teams winning all games so far in both series.

<div id="15_May_2008"> </div id>

15 May 2008 (Thursday)
Baseball:
The Oakland A's score an unearned run off Aaron Laffey in the second inning of their 4–2 loss to the Cleveland Indians, ending the scoreless streak of Indians starting pitchers at 44⅓ innings. The streak was the longest of its type in the Major Leagues in 34 years. Tribe starters still haven't given up an earned run in 50⅓ innings. (AP via Yahoo)

<div id="14_May_2008"> </div id>

14 May 2008 (Wednesday)

Association football:
 2008 UEFA Cup Final in Manchester
 Zenit St. Petersburg  2–0  Rangers
 Zenit break a scoreless tie in the 72nd minute with an Igor Denisov goal, and the Russians put an exclamation point on their win with a Konstantin Zyryanov goal in added time. The game is marred by rioting among Rangers supporters in the Manchester city centre.
Tennis:
 Citing burnout, World No. 1 woman Justine Henin announces her retirement, effective immediately. (AP via ESPN)

<div id="13_May_2008"> </div id>

13 May 2008 (Tuesday)
Basketball:
 NBA Conference Semifinals:
Eastern Conference Semifinals:
Detroit Pistons 91, Orlando Magic 86, Detroit wins series 4–1
National Football League:
 NFL Commissioner Roger Goodell, in a news conference following a three-hour meeting with former New England Patriots video assistant Matt Walsh regarding the Spygate affair, indicates that the league learned nothing new as a result of the meeting. (AP via ESPN)
Golf:
 Annika Sörenstam, the leading money-winner in the history of the LPGA, announces her retirement effective at the end of the 2008 season. (AP via ESPN)

<div id="12_May_2008"> </div id>

12 May 2008 (Monday)
Major League Baseball
Toronto Blue Jays 3, Cleveland Indians 0, 10 innings.
In the top of the fifth inning during the second game of a doubleheader, Indians second baseman Asdrúbal Cabrera turns the 14th unassisted triple play in MLB history, and the fourth turned by a second baseman.  He started it by catching a line drive by Lyle Overbay for the first out, then touched second base to bring the second out on Kevin Mench, and tagged out Marco Scutaro for the third out.
Tennis
2008 Hamburg Masters
2008 Rome Masters

<div id="11_May_2008"> </div id>

11 May 2008 (Sunday)
Association football:
Barclays Premiership
 Wigan Athletic 0–2 Manchester United
 Man U win their 10th league title with a win at JJB Stadium. Cristiano Ronaldo's 41st goal of the season and a goal from Ryan Giggs, on his 758th appearance for the club, tying Sir Bobby Charlton's record, score the goals which gives Sir Alex Ferguson the title, by two points.
 Chelsea 1–1 Bolton Wanderers
 Avram Grant's side come up short in their title ambitions, after stuttering to a draw at home to Bolton. Andriy Shevchenko had given the Blues the lead, but a late equaliser from Kevin Davies helped to cement Bolton's place in the Premiership and diminish Chelsea's slim chance of the title.
 Portsmouth 0–1 Fulham
 Fulham complete their escape from the relegation zone with a hard-fought victory at FA Cup finalists Portsmouth. Danny Murphy's goal gave the Londoners the vital three points that they required to relegate both Birmingham City and Reading.
 Birmingham 4–1 Blackburn
 Derby County 0–4 Reading
 Derby County finished the worst season for a Premiership member with one win, eight draws and 29 losses for a total of 11 points and a goal differential of minus-69 (with 20 goals scored as a team, were outscored by three players and 89 against, also premiership records) surpassing the 2003–04 and 2005–06 Sunderland teams, and their 29 losses tied the 2005–06 Black Cats' total losses.
 Everton 3–1 Newcastle
 Middlesbrough 8–1 Manchester City
 Sunderland 0–1 Arsenal
 Tottenham Hotspur 0–2 Liverpool
 West Ham United 2–2 Aston Villa

Auto racing:
Formula One: Turkish Grand Prix, at Istanbul Park, Turkey:
(1) Felipe Massa  (2) Lewis Hamilton  (3) Kimi Räikkönen 
Le Mans Series: 1000km of Spa in Circuit de Spa-Francorchamps, Belgium
(1) Nicolas Minassian , Marc Gené  & Jacques Villeneuve  (2) Alexandre Prémat  & Mike Rockenfeller  (3) Olivier Panis  & Nicolas Lapierre 
V8 Supercar: BigPond 400, at Barbagallo Raceway, Australia:
(1) Mark Winterbottom  (2) Garth Tander  (3) Jamie Whincup 

Motorcycle racing:
Superbike: Monza Superbike World Championship round, at Autodromo Nazionale Monza, Italy:
Race 1 (1) Max Neukirchner  (2) Noriyuki Haga  (3) Troy Bayliss 
Race 2 (1) Noriyuki Haga  (2) Max Neukirchner  (3) Ryuichi Kiyonari 
U.S. college basketball:
 The ESPN series Outside the Lines reports that former USC star O. J. Mayo received thousands of dollars in cash and merchandise from a runner for a sports agent during Mayo's high school career and his only season at USC. These benefits are against NCAA rules. (ESPN)

<div id="10_May_2008"> </div id>

10 May 2008 (Saturday)

Auto racing:
NASCAR Sprint Cup: Dodge Challenger 500 in Darlington, South Carolina
(1) Kyle Busch  (2) Carl Edwards  (3) Jeff Gordon 

Major League Baseball:
With a 3–2 victory over the Colorado Rockies, San Diego Padres pitcher Greg Maddux becomes just the ninth pitcher in Major League history with 350 career wins. (ESPN.com)
Shooting:
ISSF World Cup in Kerrville, Texas
 equals his own final world record in Trap, hitting 148 of 150 targets.

<div id="7_May_2008"> </div id>

7 May 2008 (Wednesday)
Ice hockey:
National Hockey League:
The Toronto Maple Leafs fire head coach Paul Maurice.
Major League Baseball:
Cincinnati Reds rookie Joey Votto hits three of the Reds' seven home runs in their 9–0 win over the Chicago Cubs. Cubs pitcher Jon Lieber gives up four homers in the second inning, becoming the second hurler in team history to give up four home runs in an inning. (AP via Yahoo)

<div id="6_May_2008"> </div id>

6 May 2008 (Tuesday)
Basketball:
Kobe Bryant of the Los Angeles Lakers wins his first National Basketball Association Most Valuable Player Award.

<div id="4_May_2008"> </div id>

4 May 2008 (Sunday)
Auto racing:
A1 Grand Prix: Round 10 at Brands Hatch, Great Britain
(1) Narain Karthikeyan  (2) Robbie Kerr  (3) Neel Jani 
A1 Team Switzerland win the third A1 Grand Prix season ahead of A1 Team New Zealand and A1 Team Great Britain.
Deutsche Tourenwagen Masters: Round 3 at Mugello, Italy
(1) Jamie Green  (2) Paul di Resta  (3) Tom Kristensen 

Basketball:
 Euroleague Final Four in Madrid
 Championship
 Maccabi Tel Aviv  77–91  CSKA Moscow
 Behind a balanced attack that saw six players score in double figures, CSKA win their second Euroleague crown in three years and sixth overall. CSKA's Trajan Langdon, who led the winners with 21 points, is named Final Four MVP.
 Third place:
Montepaschi Siena  97–93  TAU Cerámica (overtime)
 NBA Playoffs–First Round:
Eastern Conference First Round:
Boston Celtics 99, Atlanta Hawks 65, Boston wins series 4–3
Despite being blown out at the TD Banknorth Garden, the Hawks were able to survive the Celtics at the Philips Arena to force game 7 in which the Celtics easily won.
Ice hockey – National Hockey League:
2008 Stanley Cup playoffs
Eastern Conference Semifinals
Pittsburgh Penguins 3, New York Rangers 2 (OT), Pittsburgh wins series 4–1
Western Conference Semifinals
Dallas Stars 2, San Jose Sharks 1, (4OT), Dallas wins series 4–2
Brenden Morrow scores a goal at the 9:03 mark of the fourth overtime period, the fifth-longest game in modern NHL history, to eliminate the Sharks.
Motorcycle racing:
Moto GP F.I.M. Road Racing World Championship: Chinese motorcycle Grand Prix, at Shanghai International Circuit near Shanghai, China.
(1) Valentino Rossi  (2) Dani Pedrosa  (3) Casey Stoner 

<div id="3_May_2008"> </div id>

3 May 2008 (Saturday)
Track and field:
In the Jamaica International Invitational, Usain Bolt runs the 100 meter dash in 9.76 seconds, the second-fastest time ever recorded. Fellow Jamaican Asafa Powell set the world record of 9.74 seconds last year. (AP via Yahoo)
Auto racing:
NASCAR Sprint Cup: Crown Royal Presents the Dan Lowry 400 in Richmond, Virginia
(1) Clint Bowyer  (2) Kyle Busch  (3) Mark Martin 

Polo
2008 World Polo Championship
 beats  11–9 in the final to win the championship for the first time.
Horse racing:
 U.S. Triple Crown
 2008 Kentucky Derby: (1) Big Brown (2) Eight Belles (3) Denis of Cork
 Favorite Big Brown wins by 4¾ lengths. Second-place finisher Eight Belles breaks both front ankles during the post-race cool-down and is euthanized.
 British Triple Crown
 2,000 Guineas Stakes: (1) Henrythenavigator (2) New Approach (3) Stubbs Art
NHL
2008 Stanley Cup playoffs
Eastern Conference Semifinals
Philadelphia Flyers 6, Montreal Canadiens 4, Philadelphia wins series 4–1

<div id="2_May_2008"> </div id>

2 May 2008 (Friday)
Basketball:
 Euroleague Final Four in Madrid — semifinals
 Montepaschi Siena  85–93  Maccabi Tel Aviv
 TAU Cerámica  79–83  CSKA Moscow
 NBA Playoffs–First Round:
Eastern Conference First Round:
Cleveland Cavaliers 105, Washington Wizards 88, Cleveland wins series 4–2
Western Conference First Round:
Utah Jazz 113, Houston Rockets 91, Utah wins series 4–2

<div id="1_May_2008"> </div id>

1 May 2008 (Thursday)
NBA:
 Kevin Durant of the Seattle SuperSonics is named NBA Rookie of the Year.
NHL
2008 Stanley Cup playoffs
Western Conference Semifinals
Detroit Red Wings 8, Colorado Avalanche 2, Detroit wins series 4–0
Association football: UEFA Cup semifinals, second leg
 Zenit St. Petersburg  4–0  Bayern Munich: Zenit win 5–1 on aggregate
 Dick Advocaat's side progress to their first major European final after a dominant performance over the former winners of the tournament. Goals from Pavel Pogrebnyak (2), Konstantin Zyryanov and Viktor Fayzulin inflict the joint-worst defeat suffered by Bayern in European competition. Pogrebnyak will miss the final however, after picking up a yellow card for an elbow to the face of Lúcio, having taken his scoring tally for the competition to 11.
 Fiorentina  0–0  Rangers (aet): 0–0 on aggregate, Rangers win 4–2 on penalties
 Walter Smith guided his 10-man Rangers team to their first European final since 1972 after a hard-fought display in Florence. Despite having Daniel Cousin sent off in extra time, Rangers held out for the duration and took the game to a penalty shootout. At first, things looked bad for the Scots, when Sébastien Frey brilliantly saved Barry Ferguson's penalty. Kuzmanović, Whittaker, Montolivo and Papac were all successful with their kicks to leave the score at 2–2. Fiorentina's third penalty-taker Fabio Liverani then saw his penalty saved by Neil Alexander to leave the shootout level. Brahim Hemdani then scored to make it 3–2, which meant that Christian Vieri had to score to keep the fate of the shootout in their hands. He ballooned the penalty over the bar, which left Nacho Novo to score the winning penalty and see Rangers into the final.

References

05